Endotricha gregalis is a species of snout moth in the genus Endotricha. It was described by Arnold Pagenstecher in 1900, and is known from New Britain.

References

Moths described in 1900
Endotrichini